Hà Thúc Ký (1 January 1919 – 16 October 2008) was a South Vietnamese opposition politician. During the presidency of Ngô Đình Diệm he was sentenced to 20 years in prison, however, after the coup and assassination of Diệm in 1963, he was released by the rebel forces. He ran for president in the 1967 South Vietnamese presidential election, under the Đại Việt Revolutionary Party, a branch of the Nationalist Party of Greater Vietnam and was unsuccessful. In 1974, after President Nguyễn Văn Thiệu amended the "Regulations of the Political Party" into law, Ký filed an application at the Supreme Court to sue President Thiệu, declaring that the law was unconstitutional.

Early life
He was born in Huế, Annam, French Indochina and was the youngest of eight children. After graduating from high school, he attended the University of Hanoi where he earned a BS in engineering. He relocated to Cà Mau where he worked as an engineer. In 1945, the Japanese coup d'état in French Indochina took place, Ký joined the Nationalist Party of Greater Vietnam.

Political career
Since joining the Nationalist Party of Greater Vietnam, Ký participated in many anti-communist movements. On 12 December 1963 he was invited by General Dương Văn Minh, the Chairman of the Military Revolutionary Council to join Humanitarian Council, consisting of 40 people and this Council was officially launched on 9 January 1964. On the dawn of 30 January 1964 General Nguyễn Khánh launched a coup against Minh, ousting Minh and his government from power. After Khánh finally stabilize power he invited Ký to serve as Minister of Internal Affairs on 8 February 1964, but Ký only held the position for 1 month and 21 days; resigning after having some disagreements with Khánh. Ký was an unsuccessful candidate for president in the 1967 South Vietnamese presidential election. After losing his bid for president, he won a house seat in the National Assembly. In May 1965, he published the 9-point Manifesto, advocating against the Communists, demanding the realization of national unity, demanding reforms in economy, politics, culture, education, society, etc. In 1969, Ký led a delegation of all South Vietnamese political groups abroad to meet Pope Paul VI as well as other world leaders to recognize and support South Vietnam in its fight against invading Communists. In 1974, he sued President Thiệu for signing a law regulating political parties.

Life in exile
On 30 April 1975 when South Vietnam fell to the advancing Communist North Vietnamese and Viet Cong forces, Ký and his family fled the Communists by boat, resettling in the United States as political refugees. During his life in exile, he continued to fight for freedom, democracy and human rights for Vietnam and opposing the communist regime.

He died on 16 October 2008 at 12:10 pm at Holy Cross Hospital, in Silver Spring, Maryland, US.

References

1919 births
2008 deaths
South Vietnamese politicians
Members of the National Assembly (South Vietnam)